Claudio Silva may refer to:

 Cláudio Silva (born 1982), Brazilian mixed martial artist
 Claudio Silva (computer scientist), Brazilian American computer scientist
 Claudio Silveira Silva (1939–2007), Uruguayan sculptor
 Cláudio Silva (footballer) (born 1998), Portuguese footballer